Victor Gilbert Lasiston Garnet Elliot-Murray-Kynynmound, 5th Earl of Minto (12 February 1891 – 1975) was a member of the British nobility.  He was the son of Gilbert John Elliot-Murray-Kynynmound, 4th Earl of Minto and Lady Mary Caroline Grey. He married Marion Cook, daughter of George William Cook, on 19 January 1921. He died in 1975.

Marriage and children
Lord Minto (whose father had served as Canada's Governor-General) married Marion Cook, daughter of George William Cook, on 19 January 1921 in Montreal, Quebec, Canada. She was a native of Morrisburg, Ontario, Canada, and, as Countess of Minto, officiated at the unveiling of Morrisburg's World War I monument in September 1923.

Their children were:
 Lady Bridget Elliot (7 December 1921 – 19 November 2005)
 Lady Willa Elliot (b. 21 March 1924); married on 9 October 1946 Major George Chetwode. Their daughter Willa married James Elphinstone, 18th Lord Elphinstone (grandson of the former Lady Mary Bowes-Lyon and grandnephew of Queen Elizabeth The Queen Mother). Lady Willa's grandson is Alexander Elphinstone, 19th Lord Elphinstone. 
 Gilbert Edward George Lariston Elliot-Murray-Kynynmound, 6th Earl of Minto (19 June 1928 – 7 September 2005)
 The. Hon. George Esmond Dominic Elliot (13 January 1931 – 3 October 2018); married Countess Marie-Anna Berta Felicie Johanna Ghislaine Theodora Huberta Georgina Helene Genoveva Esterhazy (12 December 1938 – 27 November 2021), known as "Bunny", in 1962 (and divorced 1972), and had issue two sons (the elder Alexander dying unmarried in 1985).

Art theft
In 1930, a portrait of the 1st countess of Minto (Anna Maria (Amjand), Lady Gilbert Elliot) was stolen from the private art collection of the 5th Earl of Minto.  The portrait of the Countess, which was completed by Sir Joshua Reynolds, and was part of his 1787 Exhibition, was not recovered.

References

1891 births
People from the Scottish Borders
Earls in the Peerage of the United Kingdom
1975 deaths